Amit Bhadana is an Indian YouTuber and social media personality. He was born on September 7, 1994, in Johripur, Delhi, India. He gained popularity for his comedy sketches and vines on YouTube, which he began posting in 2017.

Amit Bhadana's YouTube channel has over 28 million subscribers as of September 2021, making him one of the most popular YouTubers in India. His videos often feature him playing multiple characters and using his comedic skills to entertain his audience. He has also been featured in several music videos and collaborated with other popular YouTubers.

Early life and education
Amit Bhadana was born in Bulandshahr, Uttar Pradesh. Later his family moved to Johri Pur, Delhi. He graduated from the University of Delhi, as a law graduate.

Career 
Bhadana's humour videos involve parodies of his friends and relatives, and their relationships. He has also published music videos, including a dub of a song by Eminem, and a reply to the song "Hello" by the artist Adele. In 2021, he released the song "Father Saab", dedicated to the memory of his father.

One of his videos was featured on YouTube's 2018 Global Top 10 Videos list. On 25 May 2020, Bhadana stated that his channel had 20 million subscribers. In December 2020, esports and mobile gaming platform Mobile Premier League appointed Bhadana as their brand ambassador.

Bhadana writes and performs his sketches in Hindi, and has a marketing team overseeing his content and working to increase his audience. DNA India included him in a list of the wealthiest Indian YouTubers in 2021.

References

External links
 

Indian YouTubers
Living people
Indian male comedians
People from Delhi
Comedy YouTubers
People from Bulandshahr
Delhi University alumni
YouTube channels launched in 2017
Year of birth missing (living people)